Brooks Crompton Wood (27 March 1870 – 29 July 1946) was a British Conservative Party politician who sat in the House of Commons from 1924 to 1929 as the Member of Parliament (MP) for Bridgwater.

References

External links 
 

1870 births
1946 deaths
Conservative Party (UK) MPs for English constituencies
UK MPs 1924–1929